Colombo - Katunayake Expressway  is Sri Lanka's second E Class highway. The  highway links the Sri Lankan capital Colombo with Bandaranaike International Airport, Katunayake and Negombo. Construction on the highway began in October 2009, and it was opened on 27 October 2013, by former president Mahinda Rajapaksa.

The total cost of the project is US $292 million. Exim Bank of China funded US$248.2 million of the total cost and the government of Sri Lanka spent US$45 million on the project.

The Expressway has 42 bridges and 88 culverts including a 480 metre long viaduct at Hunupitiya and an 800-metre viaduct at Katunayake.
The opening of the highway has allowed people to travel between Colombo, the commercial capital of Sri Lanka and Katunayake, the major international airport of Sri Lanka, within 15 minutes.

The E03 expressway links the capital Colombo with one of the major commercial hubs in the country and the major tourist destination, Negombo, within 20 minutes. 
Sri Lanka Transport Board (SLTB) has also commenced a luxury bus service on the road, conducting services between Colombo - Negombo.

History
The contract was awarded to China Metallurgical Group Corporation (MCC) by the Government of Sri Lanka and the agreement was signed on 17 August 2008.  The project loan agreements were signed on 6 August 2009 and the construction commenced on 18 August 2009. The expressway was opened on 27 October 2013 by President Mahinda Rajapaksa.

Interchanges

New Kelani Bridge Interchange
Peliyagoda Interchange
Kerawalapitiya Interchange (connect with  Outer Circular Expressway)
Ja-Ela Interchange
Katunayake Interchange

Toll Structure
 

The portion between New Kelani Bridge entrance (entry point from the City of Colombo) and Peliyagoda interchange is toll-free. Only the portion beyond Peliyagoda is operating as a toll road. Toll is to be paid at the Negombo toll-plaza when travelling direct from Peliyagoda, or when exiting at any toll-station mid-way.

ETC (Electronic toll collection) systems installed at all interchanges along the expressway.
Electronic Toll Collection (ETC) payment facility is available in all Toll Gates in Colombo-Katunayake Expressway.
ETC card will be issued at Customer Care Center located at Peliyagoda near to the Thorana Junction in Colombo-Kandy Road (A1).
Payment for the ETC shall be done by recharging an ETC account opened in Bank of Ceylon by any means such as cash, direct debit or e-banking.

Small Vehicles

Peliyagoda - Ja-Ela - LKR 200
Ja-Ela - Katunayake - LKR 200
Peliyagoda - Katunayake - LKR 300

Large Vehicles

Peliyagoda - Ja-Ela - LKR 300
Ja-Ela - Katunayake - LKR 300
Peliyagoda - Katunayake - LKR 600

Bus fares of the Private luxury service
Colombo - Katunayake - LKR 150 (Route No. 187 E-03)
Colombo - Negombo - LKR 150 (Route No. 240 E-03)

Bus fares of the SLTB super luxury service
Colombo - Katunayake - LKR 150 (Route No. 187 E-03)
Colombo - Negombo - LKR 150  (Route No. 240 E-03)

Gallery

See also
 
 
 List of A-Grade highways in Sri Lanka

References

External links

E03 expressway